Speaking with the Angel is an anthology of short stories edited by Nick Hornby. It was initially published by Penguin Books in 2000. Featuring stories from twelve established writers, the book acted as a fundraising effort for TreeHouse, a charity school for severely autistic children in London where Hornby's son was a student.

Contents
 "Introduction" by Nick Hornby
 "PMQ" by Robert Harris
 "The Wonder Spot" by Melissa Bank
 "Last Requests" by Giles Smith
 "Peter Shelley" by Patrick Marber
 "The Department of Nothing" by Colin Firth
 "I'm the Only One" by Zadie Smith
 "NippleJesus" by Nick Hornby
 "After I Was Thrown in the River and Before I Drowned" by Dave Eggers
 "LuckyBitch" by Helen Fielding
 "The Slave" by Roddy Doyle
 "Catholic Guilt" by Irvine Welsh
 "Walking into the Wind" by John O'Farrell

References

External links
Speaking with the Angel on Nick Hornby Official
Nick Hornby's page on TreeHouse

2000 anthologies
Fiction anthologies
British anthologies
Works by Nick Hornby
Penguin Books books